Goatskin may refer to:

 Goatskin (material), the skin of a goat or the leather made from it
 Goatskin (container), a container for wine